Townsville is a tropical city in Northern Queensland, Australia.

Townsville may also refer to:

Places
 City of Townsville, a local government area in northern Queensland, Australia
 Electoral district of Townsville, a Queensland State Government electoral district in Townsville, Australia
 Townsville City, Queensland, the central business district and suburb of Townsville
 Townsville, North Carolina

Other
 HMAS Townsville (FCPB 205), a Fremantle-class patrol boat launched in 1981
 HMAS Townsville (J 205), a Bathurst-class corvette that entered service in 1941
 Port of Townsville, the biggest shipping port in Northern Queensland
 Townsville (album), live album by The Necks
 City of Townsville, USA, the setting of the animated TV series The Powerpuff Girls

See also
Townville (disambiguation)